The Phoenix 18 is an American catamaran sailing dinghy that was designed by Dick Gibbs and Rod Macalpine-Downie and first built in 1964.

The boat is a smaller variant of the Shark 20 and a development of the Thai Mark IV.

The boat was named after the mythical bird as it was the first design built by the Gibbs Boat Company after its factory burned down.

Production
The design was built by the Gibbs Boat Company starting in 1964, as well as the MFG Boat Company in the United States, and Skene Boats in Canada. The design is now out of production.

Design
The Phoenix 18 is a recreational sailboat, built predominantly of fiberglass and wood. It has a fractional sloop rig. The twin hulls both have raked stems, plumb transoms, transom-hung rudders controlled by a tiller and a retractable centerboards. It displaces .

See also
List of sailing boat types

References

Dinghies
1960s sailboat type designs
Sailboat type designs by Rod Macalpine-Downie
Sailboat type designs by Dick Gibbs
Sailboat types built by Gibbs Boat Company
Sailboat types built by MFG Boat Company
Sailboat types built by Skene Boats